Natchez Light was a lighthouse on the Mississippi River that was built in 1825 and then destroyed in 1840 by a tornado.

References 

Lighthouses in Mississippi
Lighthouses completed in 1828
Buildings and structures demolished in 1840
Buildings and structures in Natchez, Mississippi